A Case of Deadly Force is an American made-for-TV drama film that was released on April 9, 1986. The movie was shot in Boston, Massachusetts, United States, starring Richard Crenna, John Shea and Dylan Baker. It was adapted from the book Deadly Force by Lawrence O'Donnell.

Plot
Fact-based story about a 1975 cover-up of an unjustified shooting of a black man by two white members of the Boston Tactical Unit. While on stakeout on a suspected getaway car used in an armed robbery, the two gunned down a black man who entered the car. The two claimed the man had a gun and they shot in self-defense. Police investigation decided it was a rightful shooting. The man's widow (Lorraine Toussaint) knew her husband would not be carrying a weapon and became determined to prove her husband's innocence. She hired a former cop (Richard Crenna), who had become a lawyer, to prove her case. Working with his four sons (John Shea, Tate Donovan, Tom Isbell, and Dylan Baker), the lawyer team takes on the police force in what eventually proved to be a landmark legal decision.

Cast
 Richard Crenna as Lawrence O'Donnell Sr.
 John Shea as Michael O'Donnell
 Lorraine Toussaint as Pat Bowden
 Francis X. McCarthy as Hanna (as Frank McCarthy)
 Tom Isbell as Billy O'Donnell
 Dylan Baker as Kevin O'Donnell
 Michael O'Hare as Joe Miller
 Tate Donovan as Lawrence O'Donnell Jr.
 Anna Maria Horsford as Virginia Cates (as Anna Marie Horsford)
 Anthony Heald as Dave O'Brian

External links

1986 television films
1986 films
1986 crime drama films
CBS network films
American courtroom films
American docudrama films
1980s English-language films
Films based on non-fiction books
Films set in 1975
Films set in Boston
Films shot in Massachusetts
Crime films based on actual events
American crime drama films
American drama television films
Films directed by Michael Miller (director)
1980s American films